Beyond Hypothermia is a 1996 Hong Kong action film directed by Patrick Leung, co-produced by Johnnie To, and starring Jacklyn Wu and Sean Lau.

Plot

Woo Chin Lin plays a brilliantly skilled hitwoman, Shu Li Fan, who for most of the movie has no name. She also has no family or friends, and for reasons not entirely clear, has a lower than average body temperature. She was rescued as a child from war-ravaged Cambodia, and raised by Mei (Shirley Wong), who is the widow of an assassin. Mei teaches the child the only thing she knows that connects her to the world: contract killing. Shu Li Fan's victims are as mysterious to her as she is to herself. However, during one of her hits she makes a sworn enemy of a Korean killer (Han Sang Woo.) There is one small ray of hope in her grim life, and that is the beginnings of a love affair with a simple and sweet-natured noodle vendor Long Shek (Hong Kong actor Lau Ching Wan.)

Cast
 Jacklyn Wu – Shu Li Han
 Sean Lau – Long Shek
 Sang Woo Han – Yichin

See also
 List of Hong Kong films
 Girls with guns

External links 
 
 Beyond Hypothermia at Hong Kong Cinemagic
 Beyond Hypothermia at Hong Kong Movie DataBase
 Beyond Hypothermia at cinemasie database

References

1996 films
1990s Cantonese-language films
Hong Kong martial arts films
1990s action films
Girls with guns films
1996 martial arts films
1990s Hong Kong films